In fluid dynamics, the von Kármán constant (or Kármán's constant), named for Theodore von Kármán, is a dimensionless constant involved in the logarithmic law describing the distribution of the longitudinal velocity in the wall-normal direction of a turbulent fluid flow near a boundary with a no-slip condition.  The equation for such boundary layer flow profiles is:

where u is the mean flow velocity at height z above the boundary. The roughness height (also known as roughness length) z0 is where  appears to go to zero.

with ρ the fluid density.

The Kármán constant is often used in turbulence modeling, for instance in boundary-layer meteorology to calculate fluxes of momentum, heat and moisture from the atmosphere to the land surface. It is considered to be a universal (κ ≈ 0.40).

Gaudio, Miglio and Dey argued that the Kármán constant is however nonuniversal in flows over mobile sediment beds.

In recent years the von Kármán constant has been subject to periodic scrutiny. Reviews (Foken, 2006; Hogstrom, 1988; Hogstrom, 1996) report values of κ between 0.35 and 0.42. The overall conclusion of over 18 studies is that κ is constant, close to 0.40.

See also
Law of the wall
Log wind profile

References
Bonan, G. B. (2005). "Land Surface Model (LSM 1.0) for Ecological, Hydrological, Atmospheric Studies. Model product". Available on-line  from Oak Ridge National Laboratory Distributed Active Archive Center, Oak Ridge, Tennessee, U.S.A.
Foken T. (2006). "50 years of the Monin-Obukhov similarity theory". Boundary-Layer Meteorology, Vol. 119, 431-447.
Gaudio, R. Miglio, R. and Dey, S. (2010). "Nonuniversality of von Kármán’s κ in fluvial streams". Journal of Hydraulic Research, International Association for Hydraulic Research (IAHR), Vol. 48, No. 5, 658-663
Hogstrom U (1996). "Review of some basic characteristics of the atmospheric surface layer". Boundary-Layer Meteorology, Vol. 78, 215-246.
Hogstrom U (1988). "Non-dimensional wind and temperature profiles in the atmospheric surface layer-a re-evaluation". Boundary Layer Meteorology, Vol. 42, 55-78.

External links
 http://www.ccsm.ucar.edu/models/ccsm3.0/cpl6/users_guide/node21.html a list of physical constants used in the NCAR Community Climate System Model

Boundary layer meteorology
Turbulence